Lipporn is a municipality in the district of Rhein-Lahn, in Rhineland-Palatinate, in western Germany. It is notable for Dudo of Laurenburg, a 12th-century Lord of Lipporn, who was a founder of the House of Nassau, an aristocratic dynasty in Europe that includes the monarchs of the Netherlands.

References

Municipalities in Rhineland-Palatinate
Rhein-Lahn-Kreis